Seo Jung-won (born 17 December 1970) is a South Korean football manager and former player, currently in charge of Chengdu Rongcheng.

Playing career 
A winger who had explosive pace, Seo was nicknamed the "Nalssaendori", which means an agile man in Korean. He played for South Korean under-23 team in the 1992 Summer Olympics in Barcelona, and scored against Sweden. He was reportedly offered a contract from FC Barcelona and other European club giants after his performances in the Olympics, but he stayed South Korea to serve a two-year mandatory military service. He also played for South Korea in the 1994 FIFA World Cup, and scored the equaliser in a 2–2 draw with Spain.

After serving in Sangmu FC, Seo longed to play in Europe and left for Germany and the Netherlands to participate in tryouts. In the summer of 1997, he succeeded to contract with Portuguese club Benfica and played four pre-season games for them. However, the Korea Football Association didn't approve of his overseas employment to qualify for the 1998 FIFA World Cup with him.

In January 1998, Seo joined French club Strasbourg, becoming the first South Korean player to play in the Ligue 1. He successfully spent his first season by contributing to their survival in the Ligue 1, but he was pushed to the bench the next season after his manager was replaced. In summer, he participated in the 1998 FIFA World Cup, although he got chickenpox transferred from his son. He showed unnoticeable performance during South Korea's elimination in the group stage.

In February 1999, he returned to South Korea and joined Suwon Samsung Bluewings. He led Suwon to 12 trophies including two Asian Club Championships for six years. Lastly, he played for Austria Salzburg and SV Ried in Austria.

Managerial career 
After South Korea's head coach Pim Verbeek resigned in July 2007, Seo entered the list for the vacant managerial position for the national team. From 2009 to 2010, he and his former national teammate and close friend, Hong Myung-bo, worked together as a part of the coaching staff for the South Korea under-20 and under-23 team. In 2010, Seo joined the coaching staff of the senior team under manager Cho Kwang-rae. Since 2012, he has been a member of the coaching staff of the Suwon Samsung Bluewings, becoming the club's manager in 2013. Under his tenure, the Bluewings finished the 2014 and 2015 seasons as runner-ups and won the Korean FA Cup in 2016. The FA Cup Final was notable as it featured Suwon Samsung Bluewings and FC Seoul, one of the biggest K League rivalries. The match went into extra time after FC Seoul scored a goal in the 93rd minute, leveling the aggregate score to 3–3 over two legs. After a scoreless extra time period, the final was decided over penalties where Suwon Samsung Bluewings won 10–9. This was Seo's first silverware of his managing career.

Career statistics

Club

International 
Results list South Korea's goal tally first.

Managerial statistics

Personal life
Seo Jung-won married in 1995 and has three son, the third son, Seo Dong-han, who is also a Forward and plays for Suwon Samsung Bluewings.

Honours

Player 
Anyang LG Cheetahs
Korean League Cup runner-up: 1992

Sangmu FC
Korean Semi-professional League (Spring): 1994

Suwon Samsung Bluewings
K League 1: 1999, 2004
Korean FA Cup: 2002
Korean League Cup: 1999+, 2000, 2001
Korean Super Cup: 1999, 2000
Asian Club Championship: 2000–01, 2001–02
Asian Super Cup: 2001, 2002

SV Ried
UEFA Intertoto Cup: 2006

South Korea
Asian Games bronze medal: 1990
Dynasty Cup: 1990

Individual
K League 1 Best XI: 1999, 2001, 2002
Asian Super Cup Most Valuable Player: 2001
Korean FA Cup Most Valuable Player: 2002
K League 30th Anniversary Best XI: 2013

Manager 
Suwon Samsung Bluewings
Korean FA Cup: 2016

Notes

References

External links
 
 National Team Player Record 
 
 [France Football League Player Profile] 
 

1970 births
Living people
Sportspeople from Gyeonggi Province
South Korean Buddhists
South Korean footballers
Association football midfielders
Korea University alumni
FC Seoul players
RC Strasbourg Alsace players
Suwon Samsung Bluewings players
FC Red Bull Salzburg players
SV Ried players
K League 1 players
Ligue 1 players
Austrian Football Bundesliga players
South Korea under-17 international footballers
South Korea under-20 international footballers
South Korea under-23 international footballers
Olympic footballers of South Korea
South Korea international footballers
Footballers at the 1990 Asian Games
Footballers at the 1994 Asian Games
Footballers at the 1992 Summer Olympics
1994 FIFA World Cup players
1996 AFC Asian Cup players
1998 FIFA World Cup players
Asian Games bronze medalists for South Korea
Medalists at the 1990 Asian Games
Asian Games medalists in football
South Korean expatriate footballers
South Korean expatriate sportspeople in France
South Korean expatriate sportspeople in Austria
Expatriate footballers in France
Expatriate footballers in Austria
South Korean football managers
Suwon Samsung Bluewings managers
K League 1 managers